Lagoinha Baptist Church (Igreja Batista da Lagoinha) is a charismatic Baptist Evangelical multi-site megachurch located in Belo Horizonte, Minas Gerais in Brazil. Márcio Valadão is the current senior pastor of the church. The church became known through one of its ministries, the worship ministry Diante do Trono, which is one of the world's largest ministries of praise, worship and mission. Some of the main services are broadcast live via Internet and also via their own TV and radio station: Rede Super. It is affiliated with the Convenção Batista Nacional and Baptist World Alliance.

History
Lagoinha Church was founded by José Rego on December 20, 1957 in Formiga street, 322, district of Lagoinha. It is the sixth Baptist Church in Belo Horizonte, became known as Lagoinha Baptist Church. The church also has a television network titled Rede Super.

On July 31, 1972, Márcio Valadão became the Senior pastor of the church, the church had 300 members.

In 2016, it had 100 campuses in Brazil and around the world.

In 2020, the Church had 50,000 people.

Music

In 1997, the Lagoinha worship ministry Diante do Trono, was formed in the church. After the release of their first album, Diante do Trono in 1998, the group became popular in Brazil. The release of Águas Purificadoras and Preciso de Ti garnered international recognition. They have become the largest worship ministry in Latin America and one of the world's largest praise ministries. It is also considered one of the most successful bands in Brazilian music.

In 2000, the group founded a house for young girls in India to combat prostitution.

See also
List of the largest evangelical megachurches

References

External links
 

Christian organizations established in 1957
Baptist churches in Brazil
Baptist Christianity in Brazil
Evangelical megachurches in Brazil
Baptist multisite churches